Austin Lee Voth (born June 26, 1992) is an American professional baseball pitcher for the Baltimore Orioles of Major League Baseball (MLB). Voth was drafted by the Washington Nationals in the fifth round of the 2013 Major League Baseball draft. He made his MLB debut in 2018.

Career

College
After graduating from Kentwood High School, Voth played college baseball at the University of Washington for the Huskies from 2011 to 2013. In 2011 and 2012, he played collegiate summer baseball with the Brewster Whitecaps of the Cape Cod Baseball League, and was named a league all-star in 2011.

Professional career

Minor leagues

Washington Nationals
The Washington Nationals drafted Voth in the fifth round of the 2013 Major League Baseball draft. He made his professional debut that season with the Gulf Coast League Nationals in the rookie-league-level Gulf Coast League. That season, the Gulf Coast League Nationals finished their regular season with a record of 49-9 and an .845 winning percentage, the highest winning percentage for a full regular season ever achieved by a minor-league baseball team based in the United States. The Nationals then won all three of their playoff games, defeating the Gulf Coast League Pirates in a single-game semifinal playoff and sweeping the Gulf Coast League Red Sox in the best-of-three league championship series, to become the 2013 Gulf Coast League champions. Voth's contribution to the championship season was to appear in two games, starting both of them, giving up four hits but no runs or walks and striking out four in five innings of work. During 2013, Voth also spent time with the Class A Short Season Auburn Doubledays in the New York-Penn League and the Class A Hagerstown Suns in the South Atlantic League. Voth finished 2013 with a 1.75 ERA over 11 starts with 55 strikeouts in  innings.

Voth returned to Hagerstown to start the 2014 season. He was promoted to the Class A Advanced Potomac Nationals in the Carolina League in June 2014 and then to the Class AA Harrisburg Senators in the Eastern League in July 2014. Voth spent 2015 with Harrisburg and for the 2016 season was promoted to the Class AAA Syracuse Chiefs in the International League. The Nationals added Voth to their 40-man roster after the 2016 season, in which he posted a 3.15 ERA in 157 innings for Syracuse. In the fall of 2016, he played for the Glendale Desert Dogs in the Arizona Fall League. The Washington Post described him as "on the doorstep of the Nationals' rotation" during preseason spring training in 2017.

However, Voth suffered a setback in 2017 when his velocity dropped sharply and his fastball fell into the mid-80s (mph), leading to a poor season in which he pitched to an overall ERA of 5.94 in 13 games with Syracuse (6.38 ERA), 10 with Harrisburg (5.13 ERA), and one with Auburn in which he gave up four hits, a walk, and three runs in two innings of work. After peaking at eighth in the MLB Pipeline biannual ranking of prospects in the Washington Nationals system before the 2017 season, Voth was not ranked in Pipeline's top 30 in advance of the 2018 season.

2018
After undergoing strength training during the 2017-2018 offseason, Voth's fastball velocity rose to as high as 93 miles per hour (150 km/hr). The improvement helped him get off to a strong start in the 2018 season with the Syracuse Chiefs; he started four games, posting a 0.96 ERA in 18 innings of work, striking out 22 and walking only two, and combining with three relievers to throw a no-hitter in a seven-inning game on April 18, 2018, and his strikeouts-per-nine-innings for Syracuse rose from 5.7 in 2017 to 10.06 in 2018. On April 29, the Nationals called Voth up to the major leagues for the first time, inserting him into their bullpen mix to deepen it a day after manager Dave Martinez was forced to use eight pitchers, including his entire bullpen, in an extra-inning game against the Arizona Diamondbacks. Voth did not appear in the April 29 game against Arizona, however, and on April 30 the Nationals called up reliever Wander Suero from Syracuse to reinforce the bullpen and optioned Voth back to Syracuse without a major-league appearance, Martinez explaining that the Nationals wanted Voth to continue to gain experience as a starter by pitching once every five days in Class AAA games as part of the Chiefs′ starting rotation. On June 18, when during the afternoon the Nationals completed a game against the New York Yankees that had been suspended due to rain on May 15 after  innings and during the evening played a make-up game against the Yankees for a May 16 rainout, the Nationals again called Voth up, but they optioned back to Syracuse on June 19, again without him seeing any action.

Voth made his major league debut at last on July 14, 2018, at Citi Field against the New York Mets. He gave up three runs after a succession of singles against him in the second inning, then appeared to recover before running out of steam in the fifth inning, in which he allowed four more runs before being lifted from the game. He took the loss as the Nationals were unable to recover from the seven-run deficit. He was optioned back to Syracuse the next day.

In 2018 he was 1–1 with a 6.57 ERA in four games (two starts).

2019
In 2019 he was 2–1 with a 3.30 ERA in nine games (eight starts), in which he struck out 44 batters in  innings. The Nationals finished the year 93–69, clinching a wild card spot. The team eventually went on to win the World Series over the Houston Astros, their first championship in franchise history. Voth was not part in any postseason action but still won his first world championship.

2020
In the shortened 2020 season, Voth was 2–5 with a 6.34 ERA in 11 starts while striking out 44 batters and walking 18 in  innings.

2021
On June 6, 2021, Voth was called to start a bullpen game against the Philadelphia Phillies. He lasted into the third inning, at which point he suffered a broken nose after being hit by a pitch from Phillies starter Vince Velasquez.

2022
After allowing 21 earned runs in  innings for a 10.13 ERA in 19 relief appearances to start the 2022 season, Voth was designated for assignment on May 31.
 He started 22 of 92 games and had a 9–8 record with a 5.70 ERA in parts of five seasons with the Nationals.

Baltimore Orioles
On June 7, 2022, Voth was claimed off waivers by the Baltimore Orioles.

References

External links

1992 births
Living people
Sportspeople from Redmond, Washington
Baseball players from Washington (state)
Major League Baseball pitchers
Washington Nationals players
Baltimore Orioles players
Washington Huskies baseball players
Brewster Whitecaps players
Gulf Coast Nationals players
Auburn Doubledays players
Hagerstown Suns players
Potomac Nationals players
Harrisburg Senators players
Syracuse Chiefs players
Fresno Grizzlies players
Glendale Desert Dogs players